Sir Michael Moissey Postan FBA (24 September 189912 December 1981) was a British historian. He was known informally as Munia Postan.

Biography
Postan was born to a Jewish family in Bendery, in the Bessarabia Governorate of the Russian Empire, and studied at the St Vladimir University in Kyiv, leaving Russia in 1919 after the October Revolution and settling in the UK. He held positions at University College London and at the London School of Economics, before being appointed Professor of Economic History at the University of Cambridge, from 1937. He was known as an economic historian of medieval Europe. Eric Hobsbawm notes he was one of the best lecturers at Cambridge, adding, "Though passionately anti-communist, Postan was the only man in Cambridge who knew Marx, Weber, Sombart and the rest of the great central and East Europeans, and took their work sufficiently seriously to expound and criticize it."

Marriages

He married historian Eileen Power in 1937. After she died in 1940, he married Lady Cynthia Rosalie Keppel, daughter of the 9th Earl of Albemarle, with whom he had two sons. He died in Cambridge.

Works 
 Studies in English Trade in the 15th Century (1933) with Eileen Power
 The Historical Method in Social Science An Inaugural Lecture (1939)
 British War Production (1952, HMSO). (Part of the History of the Second World War, United Kingdom Civil Series)
 Carte Nativorum: A Peterborough Abbey Cartulary of the Fourteenth Century (1960) with C. N. L. Brooke
 Design and Development of Weapons : Studies in Government and Industrial Organisation (1964) with D. Hay and J. D. Scott. HMSO (Part of the History of the Second World War, United Kingdom Civil Series)
Cambridge Economic History of Europe from the Decline of the Roman Empire
I: The Agrarian Life of the Middle Ages 2nd edition 1966, editor excerpt and text search
II: Trade and Industry in the Middle Ages (1952) edited with Edward Miller and Cynthia Postan
III: Economic Organization and Policies in the Middle Ages (1963) edited with E. E. Rich and Edward Miller
IV: The Cambridge Economic History of Europe, Volume IV: The Economy of Expanding Europe in the Sixteenth and Seventeenth Centuries, edited with E. E. Rich and Edward Miller
V:  The Cambridge Economic History of Europe. Volume V: The Economic Organization of Early Modern Europe  (1977) edited by E. E. Rich and C. H. Wilson
VI: The Industrial Revolutions and After (1966) edited with H. J. Habbakuk
VII: The Industrial Economies: Capital, Labour and Enterprise (1978) edited with Peter Mathias, Part 2 extending to the United States, Japan and Russia 
VIII: The Industrial Economies: The Development of Economic and Social Policies (1989) edited by Peter Mathias and Sidney Pollard

 An Economic History of Western Europe 1945 - 1964 (1967)
 Fact and Relevance: Essays on Historical Method (1971)
 The Medieval Economy and Society: Economic History of Britain, 1100-1500 (1972) Pelican Economic History of Britain #1
 Essays on Medieval Agriculture and General Problems of the Medieval Economy (1973)
 Medieval Trade and Finance (1973)

References

Further reading
Edward Miller, "Postan, Sir  Michael Moïssey  (1899–1981)" Oxford Dictionary of National Biography, Oxford University Press, 2004 accessed 3 Dec 2012

1899 births
1981 deaths
People from Bender, Moldova
People from Bendersky Uyezd
Moldovan Jews
White Russian emigrants to the United Kingdom
British people of Moldovan-Jewish descent
20th-century British people
20th-century British historians
Economic historians
Jewish historians
Academics of University College London
Academics of the London School of Economics
Fellows of the British Academy
Knights Bachelor
Jewish refugees
Russian refugees